"La solitudine" ("The Loneliness") is an Italian ballad recorded by pop singer Laura Pausini and released as her debut single by CGD in February 1993.
The song is included in Pausini's self-titled first album, released on 18 May 1993.

Pausini sang it for the first time on 23 February 1993, during the 43rd Sanremo Music Festival. On 27 February 1993, the song was announced the winner of the competition in the newcomers' section, receiving 7,464 votes.

The single reached number five on the Italian Musica e dischi Single Chart and later became an Italian standard. Following the success obtained in Italy, in late 1993 the single was released in the rest of Europe, reaching the top five in France and topping the Dutch Top 40 Singles Chart and the Belgian VRT Top 30 Singles Chart.

In 1994 Pausini released a Spanish-language version of the song, titled "La soledad" and included in her first Spanish-language album, Laura Pausini. An English-language version of the song, adapted by Tim Rice and titled "La solitudine (Loneliness)" was recorded by Laura Pausini and released as a single on 19 June 1995 to promote her self-titled compilation album.

The song was re-recorded as a slower, more dramatic ballad with live instrumentation for her 2001 compilation album The Best of Laura Pausini: E ritorno da te. The same arrangement was used for the new version of the Spanish counterpart of the song, included in Lo mejor de Laura Pausini: Volveré junto a ti.

On 1 February 2013, Pausini confirmed on her official website that all the three original versions of the song will be compiled together and released on iTunes as a celebration for her twenty-year career anniversary, titled "La solitudine / La Soledad / Loneliness". It was released one day before the day she won the Sanremo Music Festival, on 26 February 2013.

Background and composition
Federico Cavalli and Pietro Cremonesi, who at the time were two songwriters with daytime jobs outside the music business, wrote the lyrics and the music of the original version of the song, respectively. Angelo Valsiglio also contributed writing both the lyrics and the music of "La solitudine".

The lyrics to the Italian version of the song where are about a boy named Marco, who is separated from his girlfriend at the urging of his family and sent to live far away from her. The now former girlfriend makes an emotional and heartfelt plea, singing to him about the loneliness and pain they would feel without each other.

Interviewed by Italian journalist Gianni Minà, Pausini declared that the song is strongly autobiographical:

"In the beginning the song started with the words 'Anna se n'è andata' [Anna went away] instead of 'Marco se n'è andato'. But the rest of the story was exactly the photograph of my life until that moment [...]. I had never met those two authors before and, even if Valsiglio and the other composers continued to give me new songs, I told my father that I wanted to sing that one only, just changing the name to Marco, because the development of the song looked to be a copy of what was happening to me. Marco was my boyfriend in the same period, and this is why, when I was singing that song, I was feeling moved."

The English-language version of the song, adapted by Tim Rice doesn't contain any reference to Marco, but has a similar meaning. Instead of revolving around a high school sweetheart who has moved far away, the storyline focuses on a short intense summer love."

According to Univision's Fabiana Steinmander, Laura Pausini's "La solitudine" is a song "with a high degree of difficulty because of the number of vocal transitions and the modulation it demands of its singer".

The music video
Music videos of "La solitudine" and "La soledad" (the English version of the song did not have one), directed by Ambrogio Lo Giudice are quite simple, shot outdoors on the beach of Ostia in March, in which Laura Pausini is on a bridge playing with her dog. On the end, an image of Pausini's staff on that time is shown.

The new versions of both songs, released in 2001 for the "E ritorno da te" greatest hits album did not receive a new music video.

In 1999, both versions are inserted in the VHS "Video Collection 93–99".

Reception

Critical reception
The song received mixed to negative reviews by Italian music critics. According to la Repubblica's Gino Castaldo, "La solitudine" is not a great song, but singing it Pausini "seduced with her voice and her authentic determination". La Stampa'''s Marinella Venegoni wrote that, due to "La solitudine"'s "whimpering sadness", Pausini can be compared to Italian singer Marco Masini. Venegoni later described it as an immature teen-song.

Mario Luzzatto Fegiz and Gloria Pozzi wrote on the Italian newspaper Corriere della Sera that "La solitudine" initially looked to be a typical song built for the Sanremo Music Festival, but it is "a song without make-up, perfectly in tune with its interpret".

Chart performance
The song became a big hit in Italy, reaching number five on Musica e dischi's single chart in April 1993.

The song was later released in the rest of Europe, reaching the top of the Belgian Singles Chart and peaking at number five on the French Singles Chart, where it scored 44 non-consecutive weeks in the Top 50. It also became a hit in the Netherlands, where it reached the top spot of the Dutch Top 40 and it peaked for four consecutive weeks at number two on the Dutch Mega Single Top 100. Since Paul de Leeuw's version of the song, "Ik wil niet dat je liegt", topped the chart during Pausini's second week in the runner-up spot, "La solitudine" became the second song in the Dutch chart's history to chart within the top 3 with two different versions at the same time. The single was also certified Platinum by the NVPI, denoting shipments in the Netherlands exceeding 75,000 copies.

During 1994, the Spanish-language version of the song charted in the United States at number 22 on the Billboard Hot Latin Songs and at number five on the Billboard Latin Pop Songs, while the English-language version, "La solitudine (Loneliness)", released in the United Kingdom only, failed to chart on the UK Singles Chart.

A new version of the song, featured on her 2001's best of album, was released as a double A-side with "Tra te e il mare" in France. In February 2002, the single reached number 16 on the French Singles Chart.

Live performances
Laura Pausini performed the song live for the first time on 23 February 1993, competing in the newcomers' section of the 43rd Sanremo Music Festival, broadcast by Italian TV station Rai 1. The song was also performed during Pausini's Italian tour in 1993, to promote her debut self-titled album.

A live performance of the song was included in Pausini's first DVD, Live 2001–2002 World Tour, recorded at Mediolanum Forum in Milan on 2 December 2001, as well as in 2005's Live in Paris, recorded at the Zénith de Paris, and in San Siro 2007, recorded on 2 June 2007, when Pausini was the first woman to sing in the Stadio Giuseppe Meazza.

In 2002 Pausini dueted with Lara Fabian, singing "La solitudine" during a French TV show recorded in Rome.
On 21 June 2009, Pausini performed the song live with Italian rock singer Gianna Nannini, during the mega-concert Amiche per l'Abruzzo, involving the most important Italian female singers and organized to raise money to support the victims of the 2009 L'Aquila earthquake. The performance was also included in the DVD Amiche per l'Abruzzo, released on 22 June 2010.

In 2009 Pausini released her third live album, Laura Live World Tour 09, including a performance of "La solitudine" recorded in Naples. The Spanish version of the album, Laura Live Gira Mundial 09, features a recording of the song performed in Barcelona.

The Italian and Spanish versions of the song have been performed by Pausini in all of her concert tours up to The Greatest Hits World Tour.

Covers
In 1994, Thanos Kalliris recorded a Greek version of the song, titled "Το Νου σου κύριε Οδηγέ". In the same year Paul de Leeuw recorded a Dutch language version of "La solitudine", with the title "Ik wil niet dat je liegt" (English translation: I don't want you to lie).
Filipino singer Ivy Violan also recorded a Filipino language version of the song, adapted by Alvina Sy with the title "Hanggang Ngayon" for her 1998's album with the same title.

In 1994, Brazilian singer Renato Russo recorded a cover of the Italian-language version of the song for his album Equilíbrio distante. After his death, a posthumous duet with Leila Pinheiro was included in his album Duetos. The English version of the song was covered by German pop singer Jamie Stevens and included in his 2002 album Unbreakable. The Spanish singer Abraham Mateo included a cover of "La soledad" in his self-titled debut album.

Cuban timba group Bamboleo recorded a salsa version of "La soledad" for their 1996 album Te gusto o te caigo bien. A year later, DLG followed suit, recording a salsa version of "La soledad" for their 1997 album Swing On. Lead singer Huey Dunbar removed the reference to "Marco" and replaced it with "ella" (she). DLG's version also adds a spoken reggae bridge to the song, in which the woman Dunbar is singing to responds to his plea and vows to return.

In 2014, the song was performed live by Teodora Sava when she was 12 years old, in duet with Paula Seling, as special guests of the Romanian kids talent show Next Star.

In 2014, French singer of Italian origin Nyco Lilliu covered the song in Italian. The track is included in the compilation album Latin Lovers. Lilliu also released a music video for the song, but it was not an official single for him.Music video – Nyco Lilliu – La solitudine

Credits and personnel
Credits are taken from Laura Pausini'' liner notes.
 Stefano Allegra – bass
 Eric Buffat – piano, programming, background vocals
 Federico Cavalli – composer
 Sandro Chinellato – engineer
 Pietro Cremonesi – composer
 Riccardo Galardini – acoustic guitar
 Marco Marati – executive producer
 Silvia Mezzanotte – background vocals
 Cristina Montanari – background vocals
 Massimo Pacciani – drums
 Laura Pausini – vocals
 Gianni Salvatori – arranger, engineer, electric guitar, background vocals
 Angelo Valsiglio – composer, executive producer, arranger

Track listings
"La solitudine" – Italy (1993) – CD maxi (CGD 4509-92071-2)
 "La solitudine" – 4:04
 "La solitudine" (Instrumental version) – 4:04

"La solitudine" – Germany (1994) – Maxi single (EastWest 4509-95956-2)
 "La solitudine" – 4:04
 "La soledad" (Spanish-language version) – 4:04
 "La solitudine" (Instrumental version) – 4:04

"La soledad" – Spain, United States and Latin America (1994)
 "La soledad" (Spanish-language version) – 3:58
 "La solitudine" (Original Italian-language version) – 3:56
 "La solitudine" (Instrumental version) – 3:57

"La solitudine (Loneliness)" – United Kingdom (1995) – CD single (EastWest Records GmbH 4509-99006-2)
 "La solitudine (Loneliness)" (English-language version) – 3:58
 "La solitudine" (Original Italian Version) – 3:56
 "La solitudine" (Instrumental) – 3:57

Charts and sales

Weekly charts

"La solitudine"

"La soledad"

"La solitudine / La soledad / Loneliness (Medley 2013)"

Certifications

Year-end charts

"La solitudine"

Decade-end charts

"La solitudine"

References

Laura Pausini songs
1993 songs
1990s ballads
Ultratop 50 Singles (Flanders) number-one singles
Dutch Top 40 number-one singles
Pop ballads
Italian-language songs
Spanish-language songs
English-language Italian songs
Sanremo Music Festival songs
1993 debut singles
Compagnia Generale del Disco singles
Songs about loneliness